Amar Chand Joshi (18 September 1908 – 14 February 1971), also known as A. C. Joshi, was an Indian botanist and academic administrator, who served as the Vice-Chancellor of Panjab University, Chandigarh, India; and the Vice-Chancellor of Banaras Hindu University, Varanasi, India.  Joshi co authored a book titled Lahore District Flora with Shiv Ram Kashyap. It was published by Punjab University in 1936.

Early life
Joshi was born on September 18, 1908, in Bahadurpur, a suburb of Hoshiarpur in Indian Punjab. His father Ram Kishan Joshi was an Assistant Surgeon in the Government of Punjab. Joshi studied at Forman Christian College, Lahore, and completed his Bachelor of Science (Honours) (1929) in Botany from Government College, Lahore, and MSc in 1930. He completed his DSc in 1937.

Teaching career
Joshi joined as a demonstrator in Botany at Punjab University, Lahore, in 1930 and worked there until 1931, when he became an assistant professor at Banaras Hindu University, where he later became a professor. In 1945, he was selected as Professor of Botany at Government College, Lahore, and Director of the Punjab University Botanical Laboratory, Lahore. Joshi was forced to leave Lahore during the Partition of India in 1947, and he took over as Professor of Botany at the newly established Botanical Laboratory at Government College, Hoshiarpur, in 1947 where he worked until 1951. He later became Principal of the Government Training College for Teachers at Jullundur. In 1953, Joshi was appointed as Director of Public Instruction (DPI) and Secretary to the Punjab Government, where he worked until 1957.

In 1957, he was appointed Vice Chancellor of Panjab University, Chandigarh, and he served until June 1965. From July 1965 – August 1967, he was Adviser for Education in the Planning Commission. He served as Vice-Chancellor of Banaras Hindu University, in September 1967 – July 1969.

Death and legacy
After leaving Banaras Hindu University, he returned to Chandigarh, where he died on February 14, 1971. The Central Library of Panjab University, Chandigarh, is named in his honour as A C Joshi Library.

References

1908 births
1971 deaths
People from Hoshiarpur
Vice Chancellors of Banaras Hindu University
20th-century Indian botanists